The Royal's Cup is a golf tournament on the Asian Tour, played in Thailand.

It was played for the first time as a "special event" at the end of December 2017 at the Phoenix Gold Golf and Country Club, Pattaya, Thailand. There was a field of 78 and there was no cut. Prize money was US$500,000.

The second event was a full Asian Tour event played in July 2018. Prize money was again US$500,000. Justin Harding won by 6 strokes with a score of 266.

Winners

Notes

References

External links
Coverage on the Asian Tour's official site

Asian Tour events
Golf tournaments in Thailand